Palazzo Serristori may refer to:

Palazzo Serristori, Oltrarno, a Renaissance palace in Oltrarno quarter of Florence
Palazzo Serristori, Rome, a Renaissance palace in Borgo  rione of Rome
Palazzo Cocchi-Serristori, a Renaissance palace in Florence